Equalizer 2000 is a 1987 action film shot in the Philippines.

Plot
In post-nuclear Alaska, a fascist group ("The Ownership" also featured in Wheels of Fire) battles rebels in hopes of possessing a massive weapon—the "Equalizer 2000" of the title, created by ex-Ownership Captain Slade who joins the rebellion to defeat Mayor Lawton.  Lawton killed Slade's father (The Ownership's field commander) and he also wants to kill General MacLaine, The Ownership's leader, to be the new leader.

Cast
Cast adapted from the Variety review.

Production
Equalizer 2000 was shot in the Philippines.

Release
The film did not receive a theatrical release in the United States. The film was released on home video by MGM/UA Home Video on May 19, 1987, in the United States.

Reception
A reviewer credited as "Gerz." of Variety reviewed the MGM/UA Home Video release of the film on June 10, 1987.  "Gerz." described the film as "dull" and "unoriginal" while stating the film was "a laugher from start, since viewer will be more interested in where the protagonists got those musical physiques, chic black leather garb and blow-dry hairdos."

From retrospective reviews, Claude Gailard wrote in his book on post-apocalyptic films that Equalizer 2000 benefits from "the talents of a muscular Richard Norton" and Robert Patrick in his second film appearance and the presence of Corinne Wahl.

References

Sources

External links
Review by Nathan Shumate at Cold Fusion Video

1980s science fiction action films
1980s English-language films
American science fiction action films
Philippine science fiction action films
Films shot in the Philippines
American post-apocalyptic films
Philippine post-apocalyptic films
Films directed by Cirio H. Santiago
1980s American films